The "Battle" of Pogue's Run took place in Indianapolis, Indiana on May 20, 1863.  It was believed that many of the delegates to the Democrat state convention had firearms, in the hope of inciting a rebellion.  Union soldiers entered the hall that the convention took place, and found personal weapons on many of the delegates.  Afterwards, Union soldiers stopped trains that held delegates, causing many of the delegates to throw weapons into Pogue's Run, giving the event its name.

Origin
Indiana governor Oliver Morton, a Republican, heard that the Knights of the Golden Circle were planning to overthrow the Indiana government during the Democratic State Convention.  He had placed Union troops at the convention specifically to intimidate the delegates to the convention.

Convention

About four o'clock in the afternoon, while Thomas A. Hendricks was speaking at the Democrat state convention, of which there were 10,000 participants, some eight or ten soldiers with bayonets fixed and rifles cocked entered the crowd and advanced slowly toward the stand, causing a great uproar.  The multitude scattered in every direction. A high fence on the east side of the state-house square was pushed down by the rushing crowd. A squad of cavalry galloped along Tennessee street adding to the tumult. The soldiers who were moving towards the stand were ordered to halt by Colonel Coburn, who had been guarding the quartermaster's stores north of the State-house, but who came out when he heard the disturbance. He asked what they were doing. They said they were "going for Tom Hendricks," that he had said too much, and they intended to kill him. Coburn expostulated with them and they desisted. There was much confusion on the stand. Hendricks closed his remarks prematurely, suggesting that the resolutions be read and the meeting dismissed. The resolutions declared that the Federal government had two wars upon its hands, one against the rebels and one against the constitution. The Republicans in the late legislature, who had broken the quorum, were denounced, and it was declared that the Governor could not clear himself from complicity, except by taking steps to prevent repudiation.

Toward the close of the day some young soldiers walked through the crowd, and, when they heard any one speak against the war, seized the individual and marched him up the street with a great rabble following.  In many cases, after they had marched some poor fellow a few squares and thoroughly frightened him, they either slipped away or told him that if he would behave himself they would let him go. A number of men were taken to the police court and charged with carrying concealed weapons, and about forty pistols were taken from those arrested.

Train stops
Later on the night of May 20, many of the Democratic delegates took trains departing from Indianapolis.  When the meeting was over and the trains were leaving the city a great number of shots were fired from the cars on the Lafayette, Indiana and Terre Haute, Indiana railroads. The intention to create an armed disturbance, although unaccomplished, now seemed clear, and the soldiers determined to give the remaining "butternuts" a lesson.  When the Indiana Central Railroad train left the station a gun was placed in front of it upon the track. The train stopped. A small body of soldiers were collected under General Hascall, and a policeman, accompanied by a few of these soldiers, demanded the surrender of all firearms by the passengers. Nearly two hundred weapons were given up. The train to Cincinnati was also stopped, many revolvers were taken and others were thrown in great numbers, by their owners, into Pogue's Run at the side of the track. Pistols had been given to many of the women, in the belief that they would not be searched. Seven were found upon a single woman. A knife nearly two feet long was discovered in the stove in one of the cars. In all, about five hundred loaded revolvers were taken from those who had attended the meeting. Union soldiers raided two of the trains, after trailing many of the delegates from the convention to the trains, and again found many hidden handguns among the delegates.  As one of the trains was stopped by Pogue's Run, many of the Democrats threw their sidearms out of the window into the creek, giving the sarcastic name of the supposed battle.  Accounts of how many weapons landed in Pogue's Run ranged from 500 to 2,000.

Aftermath
The Indianapolis Sentinel described it as: "It is with feelings of sorrow, humiliation and degradation that we witnessed the scenes of yesterday. . . . Indiana is as completely under military rule as France, Austria or Russia". But to those who supported Morton's action, it seemed to them that would-be insurrectionists would be too cowardly to actually rebel.

The term "Battle of Pogue's Run" was given to the event by the Republican Party derisively, who praised the soldiers involved as "halt(ing) a meeting of traitors to the Union cause".  The Democrats, on the other hand, called the event "still more assaults upon constitutional rights" by those supporting Abraham Lincoln and Governor Morton.

See also
Indianapolis in the American Civil War

References

History of Indianapolis
Pogue's Run
1863 in Indiana
May 1863 events